Arzberg is a town in the district of Wunsiedel, in Bavaria, Germany. It is situated 13 km west of Cheb and 10 km northeast of Marktredwitz.

History

19th century
Porcelain was the driving force of the industrialisation in this region, since C. M. Hutschenreuther had discovered kaolin somewhat north of Arzberg and set up his production in Hohenberg an der Eger.

In 1838, Lorenz Christoph Äcker asked for the permission to establish a first Porcellain-Fabrique in Arzberg which changed hands some times until, in 1884, it was acquired by Carl Auvera (1856-1914), a grandson of C. M. Hutschenreuther, and finally by the C. M. Hutschenreuther AG, in 1919.

In 1876, Heinrich Schumann established the second one, inherited by his son Carl Schumann.

In 1887, Christoph Schumann (1864-1916), Heinrich's younger son, founded a third factory, which he already in 1891 sold to Theodor Lehmann.

Sister city

Personalities 

 Johann Arzberger (1778-1835), technician and scientist
 Ewald Drechsel (1926-1990), politician (SPD), mayor and member of parliament

References

 Singer, Friedrich Wilhelm: Arzberger Bilderbuch, Arzberg 1974  (no ISBN)
 Siemen, Wilhelm: 100 Jahre Porzellanfabrik Arzberg, 1887-1987, Schriften und Kataloge des Museums der deutschen Porzellanindustrie, vol. 9, Hohenberg an der Eger 1987  (no ISBN)

External links
Stadt Arzberg, official webpage

Wunsiedel (district)